The Schleswig-Holstein Landtag is the state parliament of the German state of Schleswig-Holstein. It convenes in the state's capital Kiel and currently consists of 69 members of five parties. The current majority consists of coalition of the Christian Democratic Union and the Greens, supporting the cabinet of Minister President Daniel Günther.

The Landtag maintains partnerships with the parliament of the West Pomeranian Voivodeship, the Oblast Duma of the Kaliningrad Oblast and the parliament of the Pomeranian Voivodeship.

Seat
Since 1950, the Landtag convenes in the Landeshaus in Kiel, which was built in 1888 as the Royal Marine Academy. During the Nazi-Era, the Landeshaus served as seat of the German Navy's Baltic Sea Command. Up to 1950, the Landtag convened in Lübeck, Flensburg and Eckernförde as well as in Kiel. Since its renovation in 2003, the Landtag is assembled in a new Chamber inside of the Landeshaus.

Electoral system
The Landtag is elected via mixed-member proportional representation. 35 members are elected in single-member constituencies via first-past-the-post voting. 34 members are then allocated using compensatory proportional representation. Voters have two votes: the "first vote" for candidates in single-member constituencies, and the "second vote" for party lists, which are used to fill the proportional seats. The minimum size of the Landtag is 69 members, but if overhang seats are present, proportional leveling seats will be added to ensure proportionality. An electoral threshold of 5% of valid votes is applied to the Landtag; parties that fall below this threshold, and fail to win at least one constituency, are ineligible to receive seats. Parties representing the Danish minority of Southern Schleswig and the Frisians, such as the South Schleswig Voters' Association, are exempt from the threshold.

Presidents of the Landtag
So far, the presidents of the Landtag of Schleswig-Holstein have been:
 1946 Paul Husfeldt, Christian Democratic Union (CDU)
 1946 – 1954 Karl Ratz, Social Democratic Party (SPD)
 1954 – 1959 Walther Böttcher, Christian Democratic Union (CDU)
 1959 – 1964 Claus-Joachim von Heydebreck, Christian Democratic Union (CDU)
 1964 – 1971 Paul Rohloff, Christian Democratic Union (CDU)
 1971 – 1983 Helmut Lemke, Christian Democratic Union (CDU)
 1983 – 1987 Rudolf Titzck, Christian Democratic Union (CDU)
 1987 – 1992 Lianne Paulina-Mürl, Social Democratic Party (SPD)
 1992 – 1996 Ute Erdsiek-Rave, Social Democratic Party (SPD)
 1996 – 2005 Heinz-Werner Arens, Social Democratic Party (SPD)
 2005 – 2009 Martin Kayenburg, Christian Democratic Union (CDU)
 2009 – 2012 Torsten Geerdts, Christian Democratic Union (CDU)
 2012-2022 Klaus Schlie, Christian Democratic Union (CDU)
 since 7 June 2022 Kristina Herbst, Christian Democratic Union (CDU)

References

External links
  

Schleswig-Holstein
Landtag of Schleswig-Holstein